Zoltán Kemény (21 March 1907 – 14 June 1965) was a sculptor.

Kemény was born in Bănița, Austro-Hungarian Empire (present-day Romania). He was the only Hungarian to win a prize at the Venice Biennale. He died in Zurich, Switzerland, aged 58.

See also 
List of sculptors

External links
Biography at Lorenzelliarte.com
Biography from Centre Pompidou
Page at the Tate Gallery (London)

1907 births
1965 deaths
People from Hunedoara County
Hungarian sculptors
Modern sculptors
20th-century sculptors